A Tree of 40 Fruit is one of a series of fruit trees created by the Syracuse University Professor Sam Van Aken using the technique of grafting. Each tree produces forty types of stone fruit, of the genus Prunus, ripening sequentially from July to October in the United States.

Development 
Sam Van Aken is an associate professor of sculpture at Syracuse University. He is a contemporary artist who works beyond traditional art making and develops new perspective art projects in communication, botany, and agriculture. Aken was a 2018 Artist-in-Residence at the McColl Center for Art + Innovation in Charlotte, NC.

His family is Pennsylvania Dutch, and he grew up on the family farm.

In 2008, while looking for specimens to create a multicolored blossom tree as an art project, Van Aken acquired the  orchard of the New York State Agricultural Experiment Station, which was closing due to funding cuts. He began to graft buds from some of the over 250 heritage varieties grown there, some unique, onto a stock tree. Over the course of about five years the tree accumulated branches from forty different "donor" trees, each with a different fruit, including almond, apricot, cherry, nectarine, peach and plum varieties.

Each spring the tree's blossom is a mix of different shades of red, pink and white.

The tree of 40 fruits was originally conceived as an art project, and Sam Van Aken hoped that people would notice that the tree has different kinds of flower in spring and has different types of fruit in summer. However, the project also introduces the changes in agricultural practices over the centuries.

Distribution 

, Van Aken had produced 16 Trees of 40 Fruit, installed in a variety of private and public locations, including community gardens, museums, and private collections. Locations include Newton, Massachusetts; Pound Ridge, New York; Short Hills, New Jersey; Bentonville, Arkansas; and San Jose, California. He has plans to populate a city orchard with the trees.

References

External links 
  - includes photographs and map
 The Gift Of Graft: New York Artist's Tree To Grow 40 Kinds Of Fruit on Weekend Edition Sunday, 3 August 2014
  - talk by Van Aken at TEDxManhattan in 2014
  - National Geographic, 21 July 2015
  - CBS News This Morning, 23 August 2014

Trees
Horticulture
Environmental art